The 1999–2000 SK Rapid Wien season is the 102nd season in club history.

Squad statistics

Goal scorers

Fixtures and results

Bundesliga

League table

Cup

Champions League qualification

UEFA Cup

References

1999-2000 Rapid Wien Season
Austrian football clubs 1999–2000 season